Verkh-Irmen is a rural locality (a selo) and the administrative center of Verkh-Irmensky Selsoviet of Ordynsky District, Novosibirsk Oblast, Russia. Population: 3123 (2010 Census). The settlement is located on the Irmen River, it is situated 60 kilometers southwest of Novosibirsk, 32 kilometers northeast of Ordynskoye and 8 kilometers from the coast of the Novosibirsk Reservoir.

History
Verkh-Irmen was first mentioned in 1775.

Economy
 The "Irmen" is an agricultural enterprise, one of the largest milk producers in Novosibirsk Oblast.

Famous natives
 Vyacheslav Larents (born 1994) is a Russian football player.

References

Rural localities in Novosibirsk Oblast
Populated places established in 1775